Jesmond Giordemaina (born 13 July 1966) is a Maltese wrestler. He competed at the 1984 Summer Olympics and the 1988 Summer Olympics.

References

External links
 

1966 births
Living people
Maltese male sport wrestlers
Olympic wrestlers of Malta
Wrestlers at the 1984 Summer Olympics
Wrestlers at the 1988 Summer Olympics
Place of birth missing (living people)